2012 in Chinese football involved the national competitions of the Chinese football league system and the national team.

Domestic leagues

Promotion and relegation
Teams relegated from the Super League
 Chengdu Blades F.C.
 Shenzhen Ruby F.C.

Teams promoted to the Super League
 Dalian Aerbin F.C.
 Guangzhou R&F F.C.

Teams relegated from League one
 Guizhou Zhicheng F.C.

Teams promoted to League One
 Harbin Songbei Yiteng F.C.
 Chongqing F.C.
 Fujian Smart Hero F.C.

Chinese Super League

China League One

China League Two

Domestic cups

Super Cup

Chinese FA Cup

National team

Men

Women

References

 
Seasons in Chinese football